Praia Grande (Portuguese for "Long Beach") may refer to:

Praia Grande, Santa Catarina, Brazil
Praia Grande, São Paulo state, Brazil
Praia Grande (Ferragudo), a beach in the concelho of Lagoa (Algarve), Portugal
Praia Grande (Macau), a bay in Macau

See also

Praia (disambiguation)